Mazzarini is an Italian surname. Notable people with the surname include:

Girolama Mazzarini (died 1656), Italian courtier
Giulio Mazzarini, Italian photographer
Laura Margherita Mazzarini (1608–1685), Italian courtier
Pietro Mazzarini (1576–1634), Italian courtier
Andrea Mazzarani Italian professional footballer

Italian-language surnames